The Swiss Literature Awards (which were known as the Federal Literature Awards) is a Swiss literary award presented by the Federal Office of Culture (FOC).

History

The organization of the Awards is given to FOC in the context of the Law of Encouragement for Culture (LEC). They replace the Schiller Prize which was awarded for the last time in the spring of 2012.
In December 2012 the Swiss Literature Awards rewarded eight literary works that had marked the year. The federal literature jury, presided over by Dominik Müller, made their choice for this first award from 236 participating works.

Principals

The awarded authors receive 25,000 Swiss francs each and benefit from specific support measures, so that they may be better known on the national level
. Lectures are organized in all of Switzerland so that they may reach their public beyond the linguistic boundaries of the languages of Switzerland. The quadrilingual web platform Prixliterature.ch presents the jury's commentary about the prizewinning works and gives a first impression of the author's life experience and bibliography.

Winners

References 

Swiss culture
Swiss literary awards